The Belgravia Hotel, also known as Peale House, is a historic building in Philadelphia, Pennsylvania.

It was added to the National Register of Historic Places in 1982. It was listed on the Philadelphia Register of Historic Places on June 3, 1982.

The building was formerly the site of a hotel but has been developed into condominiums.

Famous former residents include violist William Primrose and violinist Efrem Zimbalist.

References

External links
Listing at Philadelphia Architects and Buildings

Residential buildings on the National Register of Historic Places in Philadelphia
Beaux-Arts architecture in Pennsylvania
Hotel buildings completed in 1902
Philadelphia Register of Historic Places
Rittenhouse Square, Philadelphia